This is a list of association football families of former Yugoslavia and its successor national association football teams.

Families included on the list must have
 at least, one member of the family is capped by a national team on the senior level or an important person in the game of football (e.g., notable coaches, referees, club chairmen, etc.)
 a second member must be a professional player or capped by a national team on the U-17 level or above.

Bosnia and Herzegovina 

 Nail Beširović, Dino Beširević (son)
 Milorad Bilbija, Nemanja Bilbija (son)
 Dragan Glogovac, Stevo Glogovac (brother)
 Anel Hadžić, Elvir Hadžić (brother),   Damir Hadžić (cousin)
 Izet Hajrović, Sead Hajrović (brother)
 Sejad Halilović,  Alen Halilović (son),  Dino Halilović (son)
 Vedad Ibišević, Elvir Ibišević (cousin)
 Dušan Kerkez,  Strahinja Kerkez (son)
 Meho Kodro, Kenan Kodro (son)
 Boban Lazić,  Vlatko Lazić (cousin)
 Jasmin Mujdža, Mensur Mujdža (brother)
 Husref Musemić, Vahidin Musemić (brother)
 Zlatan Nalić, Adi Nalić (son)
 Emir Spahić, Edin Džeko (cousin)
 Safet Sušić, Sead Sušić (brother)
 Armin Tanković,  Muamer Tanković (cousin)
 Damir Vrančić, Mario Vrančić (brother)
 Ognjen Vranješ, Stojan Vranješ (brother)
 Zlatko Vujović, Zoran Vujović (brother)

Croatia 
 Josip Bulat, Ivan Bulat (brother), Marko Bulat (son)
 Davor Čop, Duje Čop (son)
 Branko Culina,  Jason Culina (son)
 Tonči Gabrić, Drago Gabrić (son), Paškvalina Gabrić (daughter)
 Nikola Gavrić,  Andrea Gavrić (sister)
 Alen Halilović (see  Sejad Halilović)
 Zdenko Jedvaj, Tin Jedvaj (son)
 Niko Kovač, Robert Kovač (brother)
  Zlatko Kranjčar, Niko Kranjčar (son)
 Ivica Landeka,  Davor Landeka (brother), Iva Landeka (sister), Josip Landeka (cousin)
 Dejan Lovren, Davor Lovren (brother)
 Stojan Mamić, Zdravko Mamić, Zoran Mamić (brothers)
 Mato Mandžukić, Mario Mandžukić (son)
 Tomislav Marić, Marijo Marić (brother)
 Luka Modrić (see  Mark Viduka)
 Igor Pamić, Alen Pamić, Zvonko Pamić (sons)
 Dado Pršo,  Lorenzo Pršo (son),  Milan Pršo (cousin),  Luka Prso (nephew)
 Milan Rapaić, Boris Rapaić (son)
 Krševan Santini, Ivan Santini (brother)
 Milan Šašić, Marko Šašić (son),  Célia Šašić (daughter-in-law)
 Kujtim Shala,  Andis Shala (son)
 Ahmad Sharbini, Anas Sharbini (brother)
 Dario Šimić, Josip Šimić (brother), Roko Šimić (son)
 Zvonimir Soldo, Matija Soldo, Filip Soldo, Nikola Soldo (sons)
 Filip Tapalović,  Toni Tapalović (brother)
 Vladimir Vasilj,  Nikola Vasilj (son)
 Rudika Vida, Domagoj Vida (son)
 Rado Vidošić,  Dario Vidošić (son)

Kosovo 
 Agim Ajdarević,  Astrit Ajdarević (son),  Alfred Ajdarević (son)
 Enis Alushi,  Fatmire Alushi (née Bajramaj) (wife)
 Halil Asani,  Elmir Asani (son)
 Besart Berisha, Enis Fetahu, Samir Ujkani (brother-in-law)
 Valon Berisha,  Veton Berisha (brother)
 Suad Sahiti,  Emir Sahiti (brother)
 Arianit Shaqiri,  Xherdan Shaqiri (brother)
 Enis Terziqi, Essad Terziqi, Xhelal Terziqi, Xhemil Terziqi (brother),  Xhafer Terziqi

Montenegro 
 Bojan Brnović, Nenad Brnović (brother)
 Branko Brnović, Dragoljub Brnović (brother)
 Igor Gluščević, Vladimir Gluščević (brother)
 Ivan Ivanović, Igor Ivanović (brother)
 Matija Sarkic, Oliver Sarkic (twins)

North Macedonia 
 Boban Babunski, David Babunski (son), Dorian Babunski (son)
 Boško Gjurovski, Milko Gjurovski (brother), Mario Gjurovski (son of Milko)
 Agim Ibraimi, Arijan Ademi (cousin)
 Goran Pandev, Sashko Pandev (brother)
 Stefan Ristovski, Milan Ristovski (brothers)
 Goran Stankovski, Luka Stankovski (son)

Serbia

A
 Ivan Adžić, Luka Adžić (son)
 Dušan Arsenijević, Filip Arsenijević (son), Nemanja Arsenijević (son/brother)
 Halil Asani, Elmir Asani (son)

B
 Dragiša Binić, Vladan Binić (son)
 Nenad Bjeković, Nenad Bjeković Jr. (son)
 Goran Bunjevčević, Mirko Bunjevčević (brother)

C
 Ivan Čančarević, Milan Čančarević (brother), Luka Čančarević (son of Ivan/nephew), Ognjen Čančarević (nephew/son of Milan/cousin)
 Srđan Čebinac, Zvezdan Čebinac (twin brother)
 Miroslav Čermelj, Luka Čermelj (son), Filip Čermelj (son/brother)
 Goran Ćurko, Saša Ćurko (son)

D
 Milan Davidov, Aleksandar Davidov (cousin)
 Zoran Dimitrijević, Miloš Dimitrijević (son)
 Boban Dmitrović, Filip Dmitrović (son)
 Goran Đorović, Zoran Đorović (twin brother)
 Ivan Dudić, Milan Dudić (twin brother)

F
 Darko Fejsa, Ljubomir Fejsa (brother)

G
 Vladimir Gaćinović, Mijat Gaćinović (son)
 Pavle Grubješić, Nikola Grubješić (son)
 Nebojša Gudelj, Nemanja Gudelj (son), Dragiša Gudelj (son/brother)

I
 Luka Ilić, Ivan Ilić (brother)
 Ilija Ivić, Vladimir Ivić (brother)

K
 Zlatko Kežman, Mateja Kežman (son)
 Dušan Kljajić, Filip Kljajić (son)
 Nikola Kolarov, Aleksandar Kolarov (brother)
 Bojan Krasić, Miloš Krasić (brother)
 Slobodan Krčmarević, Nikola Krčmarević (son)
 Blagomir Krivokuća, Petar Krivokuća (brother), Bratislav Živković (son-in-law of Blagomir/cousin)
 Bojan Krkić Sr.,  Bojan Krkić (son)
 Slavoljub Krnjinac, Vladimir Krnjinac (son)

L
 Nikola Lazetić, Žarko Lazetić (brother)

M
 Nebojša Marinković, Nenad Marinković (brother)
 Filip Marković, Lazar Marković (brother)
 Nemanja Matić, Uroš Matić (brother)
 Radmilo Mihajlović, Stefan Mihajlović (son)
 Milan Milijaš, Nenad Milijaš (cousin)
 Duško Milinković, Marko Milinković (son)
 Nikola Milinković, Sergej Milinković-Savić (son), Vanja Milinković-Savić (son/brother)
 Goran Milojević, Vladan Milojević (brother), Stefan Milojević (son of Goran/nephew),  Nemanja Milojević (nephew/son of Vladan/cousin)
 Savo Milošević, Nikola Milošević (son)
 Đorđe Milovanović, Dejan Milovanović (son), Branislav Ivanović (nephew/cousin)
 Goran Milovanović, Neško Milovanović (brother), Uroš Milovanović (son of Goran/nephew), Vasilije Veljko Milovanović (nephew/son of Neško/cousin)
 Miloš Milutinović, Milorad Milutinović (brother),  Bora Milutinović (brother)
 Mitar Mrkela, Andrej Mrkela (son)
 Slavoljub Muslin,  Marko Muslin (son)

O
 Dragan Okuka, Dražen Okuka (son)

P
 Blagoje Paunović, Veljko Paunović (son)
 Ilija Petković, Dušan Petković (son)

R
 Bogdan Račić, Uroš Račić (twin brother)
 Branko Rašović, Vuk Rašović (son)

S
 Dušan Savić, Vujadin Savić (son)
 Slađan Šćepović, Stefan Šćepović (son), Marko Šćepović (son/brother)
 Milovan Sikimić, Predrag Sikimić (brother)
 Branko Smiljanić, Milan Smiljanić (son)
 Dragoljub Srnić, Slavoljub Srnić (twin brother)
 Dejan Stanković, Filip Stanković (son),  Milenko Ačimovič (brother-in-law)
 Predrag Stevanović,  Aleksandar Stevanović (brother)
 Vladan Stojković, Vladimir Stojković (brother),  Vladimir Stojković (son)
 Miljaim Sulejmani, Miralem Sulejmani (son)
 Ratko Svilar, Mile Svilar (son)

V
 Zvonko Varga, Saša Varga (son)
 Nebojša Vignjević, Nikola Vignjević (brother)
 Nebojša Vučićević, Vanja Vučićević (son)
 Vukadin Vukadinović, Miljan Vukadinović (brother)

Z
 Ilija Zavišić, Bojan Zavišić (son)
 Nikola Žigić, Branko Žigić (brother)

Slovenia 
 Aleš Čeh, Nastja Čeh (brother)
 Branko Elsner, Marko Elsner (son), Luka Elsner, Rok Elsner (grandsons, sons of Marko)
 Primož Gliha, Erik Gliha (son)
 Damir Hadžić,  Anel Hadžić (cousin),  Elvir Hadžić (cousin, brother of Anel)
 Jasmin Handanović, Samir Handanović (cousin)
Amir Karić, Sven Karić (son)
 Miha Mevlja, Nejc Mevlja (twin brother)
 Mladen Rudonja, Roy Rudonja (son)
 Zlatko Zahovič, Luka Zahovič (son)

Yugoslavia 
 Dragutin Babić, Nikola Babić (brother)
 Zoran Batrović,  Veljko Batrović (son)
 Bruno Belin, Rudolf Belin (brother)
 Mirko Bonačić,  (brother)
 Bojan Brnović, Nenad Brnović (brother)
 Dragoljub Brnović, Branko Brnović (brother)
 Zlatko Čajkovski, Željko Čajkovski (brother)
 Srđan Čebinac, Zvezdan Čebinac (twin brother)
 Zvjezdan Cvetković, Borislav Cvetković (brother)
 Ranko Đorđić,  Bojan Djordjic (son)
 Nebojša Gudelj,  Nemanja Gudelj,  Dragiša Gudelj (sons)
 Ilija Ivić,  Vladimir Ivić (brother)
 Fahrudin Jusufi, Sascha Jusufi (son)
 Bojan Krkić, Sr.,  Bojan Krkić (son),  Lionel Messi (fourth cousin of Bojan, Jr.)
 Zoran Marić,  Goran Marić (son)
 Nikola Marjanović, Blagoje Marjanović (brother)
 Jozo Matošić, Frane Matošić (brother)
 Predrag Mijatović,  Đorđije Ćetković (nephew),  Marko Ćetković (nephew, brother of Đorđije)
 Duško Milinković,  Marko Milinković (son)
 Miloš Milutinović, Milorad Milutinović (brother), Bora Milutinović (brother)
 Ivica Osim,  Amar Osim (son)
 , Alfons Pažur (brother)
 Ilija Petković,  Dušan Petković (son)
 Refik Šabanadžović,  Anel Šabanadžović (son)
 ,  (brother)
 Niša Saveljić,  Esteban Saveljich (cousin)
 Sead Sušić,  Safet Sušić (brother),  Tino-Sven Sušić (son of Sead)
 Ratko Svilar,  Mile Svilar (son)
 Zlatko Vujović, Zoran Vujović (twin brother)
 Dušan Zinaja, Branko Zinaja (brother)

Notes

References

Serbia
families